Thérèse Humbert (1856–after 1936) was a French female fraudster, who pretended to be an heir of an imaginary American millionaire named Robert Crawford.

Biography
Humbert was born Thérèse Daurignac, a peasant girl in Aussonne, Midi-Pyrénées, France. As a child, she once convinced her friends to pool their jewelry so that she could fool others into believing she was wealthy. She married Frédéric Humbert, son of the mayor of Toulouse. Soon after, she began to tell a tale that she had received an unusual inheritance.

Humbert claimed that in 1879, when she was in a train, she heard groans from the next compartment. She entered into it by climbing along the outside of the train. There she found a man who was having a heart attack. When she had helped him with her smelling salts, the man told her he was an American millionaire named Robert Henry Crawford, and that he was eternally grateful and would reward her some day. Two years later in 1881, she received a letter stating that Crawford had died and made her beneficiary of his will. The will stated that the Humberts were to look after the family fortune in a safe that should remain sealed until her younger sister Marie was old enough to marry one of Crawford's two nephews, Henry Crawford.

With this story, Humbert obtained a huge loan using the supposed inheritance as a collateral.

Humbert gathered much influence, fame and wealth. Her salon became a center of socializing. Humbert and her associates, other members of the Humbert family, borrowed money against the nonexistent inheritance. They lived in luxury for about 20 years, spending their money on flowers, elaborate dresses and banquets. Eventually they had to borrow more money to cover the previous loans. There were suspicions, but nobody was able to prove the story false.

In 1883,  newspaper published a skeptical article, but Humbert's father-in-law, who at the time was the minister of justice, supported her story. Humbert claimed that the Crawfords had sued him so that she would have to place her part of the inheritance to  bank. After lengthy litigation, during which the two Crawford nephews, Henry and Robert, appeared in court, the court ruled that the locked safe should remain in Humbert's possession.

When Jules Bizat, official for the French bank, asked Humbert how she had invested her money, she claimed that it was in government bonds. Bizat checked and found that it was not the case. Humbert had organized a generous pension plan she had named  to get more money and used it to pay her debts and buy bonds.

Eventually the creditors noticed that the supposed amount of the inheritance would never be able to cover all the loans and legal costs. Le Matin demanded that the safe should be opened. In 1901, Humbert's creditors sued her, and the next year the Parisian court gave an order that the fabled safe would be opened to prove the existence of the money. The safe was found nearly empty, containing only a brick and an English halfpenny.

The scandal rocked the French financial world, and thousands of smaller creditors and investors were ruined. The in-laws of the painter Henri Matisse, M. and Mme. Parayre, became scapegoats in the affair. Matisse's mother-in-law, who was the Humbert family's housekeeper, fell under suspicion, and her husband was arrested. Matisse's studio was searched by detectives, and his wife's family found themselves menaced by angry mobs of fraud victims. M. Parayre eventually went on hunger strike in an attempt to clear his name, with Matisse acting in lieu of a lawyer.

The Humberts had already fled the country, but they were arrested in Madrid in December 1902. Thérèse Humbert was tried and sentenced to five years' hard labor. Her two brothers, who had masqueraded as Crawford's nephews, were sentenced to two and three years each. Her husband Frédèric was also sentenced to five years. Her sister Marie, daughter Eve and deceased father-in-law, the justice minister Gustave Humbert, were stated to be victims of the fraud.

The generally held theory is that when Thérèse Humbert was released from prison, she emigrated to the United States and that she died in Chicago in 1918. People whom she had defrauded remained mostly silent to avoid further embarrassment.

Most sources repeat that Thérèse emigrated to Chicago where she died. However, in the weekly paper , edition number 79 dated 1 May 1930, there is an article entitled   (20 Years of Conjuring'). The article is written by Monsieur J. France who was one of the leading lights in the prosecution against Thérèse Humbert and who went to Madrid to take her back to Paris for trial. The story of the fraud is retold in the article following the death of Romain Daurignac, the brother of Thérèse. In this article, J. France says: 'Thérèse Humbert is still living, poorly, in Paris. She has lost her miraculous vitality. What a reverse of fortune her golden past has left her. She is a quite humble old lady, who never speaks to anyone." There are also two photos. One of these shows the door to a house in Paris and has underneath the note: 'Here, boulevard des Batignolles, lives to-day, she who was ''. On the second photo the note beneath says: 'Behind these windows with the white curtains, Thérèse Humbert meditates on her past'. Her husband died in 1936; he is not listed as a widower.

Adaptations 

A French crime drama based on her life was released in 1983, Thérèse Humbert, directed by Marcel Bluwal and written by Jean-Claude Grumberg, with Oscar and Emmy winning actress Simone Signoret as Thérèse Humbert.

Notes

References
 Spurling, Hilary - La Grande Thérèse: The Greatest Swindle of the Century.
Spurling, Hilary, 2005, "Matisse's Pajamas", The New York Review of Books, August 11, 2005, pp. 33–36.
The New York Times Scam Artiste Alice Kaplan July 9, 2000.

External links
 L'Affaire Humbert, an in-depth look at her swindle and French society of the time.

French fraudsters
French female criminals
Confidence tricksters
People from Haute-Garonne
1856 births
1918 deaths